Jan Elvedi (born 30 September 1996) is a Swiss professional footballer who plays as a centre-back for Jahn Regensburg.

Career
Elvedi made his professional debut for Jahn Regensburg in the 2020–21 DFB-Pokal on 13 September 2020, starting in the home match against 3. Liga side 1. FC Kaiserslautern.

Personal life
Elvedi's twin brother, Nico, is also a professional footballer who plays for Bundesliga club Borussia Mönchengladbach.

References

External links
 
 
 
 Career statistics at SFL.ch

1996 births
Living people
Footballers from Zürich
Swiss men's footballers
Association football central defenders
FC Winterthur players
SC Cham players
FC Wohlen players
SC Kriens players
SSV Jahn Regensburg players
Swiss Challenge League players
Swiss Promotion League players
2. Bundesliga players
Twin sportspeople
Swiss twins
Swiss expatriate footballers
Swiss expatriate sportspeople in Germany
Expatriate footballers in Germany